Kenneth B. Bunn Jr. (1928 – March 12, 2009) was an American football player and coach.  He served as the head football coach at Juniata College from 1956 to 1962 and at Lafayette College from 1963 to 1966. Bunn played college football at Pennsylvania State University, where he lettered in 1949 and 1950.

Head coaching record

Football

References

External links
 

1928 births
2009 deaths
Penn State Nittany Lions football players
Juniata Eagles football coaches
Lafayette Leopards football coaches